Ponnambalam (born 11 November 1963) is an Indian actor and stuntman who has predominantly appeared in Tamil language films. He is best known for playing antagonistic roles in Indian films during the 1990s, notably appearing in films such as Nattamai (1994), Muthu (1995) and Amarkalam (1999). Later in his career, Ponnambalam also appeared in a few leading roles, while also taking up the mantle of director and producer.

Career
Ponnambalam made his debut in cinema as a stuntman, and often appeared as an extra fighter in films, starring in minor roles in films including Apoorva Sagodharargal (1989) and Michael Madana Kama Rajan (1990). As a result of his proficiency as a stuntman, he later received the nickname "Spare Parts" Ponnambalam as no part of his body was ever injured or fractured. He made a breakthrough as an actor following the success of P. Vasu's Walter Vetrivel (1993), and subsequently starred in several prominent Tamil films in the 1990s in villainous roles. Notable characters he portrayed including his work in Nattamai (1994), Muthu (1995) and Amarkalam (1999). Ponnambalam also played the lead roles in film including the action drama Muthal Echarikkai (1999) and Ammaiyappa (2002), where he featured alongside actress Roshini. Reviewing the film, a critic noted "the movie does little other than prove conclusively that Ponnambalam is not cut out to be a hero", and that "though he picks a role that suits his build, emotes surprisingly well and fights aggressively, his looks make it difficult for us to accept him as a conventional leading man".

Ponnambalam turned director and producer through the film, Pattaya Kelappu, starring Sriman in the lead role. Despite beginning in 2004, the film had a delayed release, while another directorial venture titled Thethi 32 was subsequently dropped. Ponnambalam began a project titled Idiyudan Koodiya Mazhai during 2010, starring newcomers. Despite beginning production, the film was shelved and eventually did not have a theatrical release. His acting commitments thereafter also decreased, with notable appearances in the period including roles as a village chief in Thamizh Padam (2010) and characters in Venghai (2011) and the historical drama, Ponnar Shankar (2011).

In 2018, Ponnambalam took part in the second season of the reality show Bigg Boss Tamil hosted by Kamal Haasan. His stay in the house was controversial, as he was accused of making misogynistic comments against the female housemates, particularly against Yashika Aanand, Aishwarya Dutta, Mamathi Chari and Mumtaj and was nominated each week for the eviction from the second week of the show onwards. He was evicted during the eighth week of the show during mid-August 2018.

Personal life
Ponnambalam joined the All India Anna Dravida Munnetra Kazhagam (AIADMK) in February 2011, beginning a career in politics. He campaigned for the AIADMK party in the Indian general election of 2014. In June 2017, he left the AIADMK and joined the Bharatiya Janata Party (BJP) in the presence of the Union Minister of State for Finance and Shipping, Pon Radhakrishnan. On joining the party, Ponnambalam stated that no other party seemed "concerned about the welfare of people" and hence, he decided to join the BJP.

Filmography

Actor

Stuntman

Television 
 Bigg Boss Tamil 2 (2018)

References

External links
 

Indian male film actors
Male actors in Tamil cinema
Living people
1963 births
Bigg Boss (Tamil TV series) contestants